The Automobile Association of South Africa, often abbreviated AA is an automobile association that has been operating in South Africa since 1930. It is a non-profit organisation providing services to its members such as roadside assistance, technical and motor-related legal advice. It also maintains liaison with government departments to influence decisions, either by lobbying or making formal representations on behalf of motorists.

References

External links
 AA  - Automobile Association of South Africa

Financial services companies established in 1930
Automobile associations
Organizations established in 1930
Organisations based in Johannesburg
Transport organisations based in South Africa
Road transport in South Africa
Advocacy groups in South Africa
Emergency road services